Blue Jean is a 2022 British drama film written and directed by Georgia Oakley, in her directorial debut. It stars Rosy McEwen, Kerrie Hayes and Lucy Halliday.

The film premiered on 3 September 2022 at the Venice Film Festival and was released in cinemas on 10 February 2023.

Cast
 Rosy McEwen as Jean
 Kerrie Hayes as Viv
 Lucy Halliday as Lois
 Lydia Page as Siobhan
 Stacy Abalogun as Ace
 Amy Booth-Steele as Debbie
 Aoife Kennan as Sasha
 Scott Turnbull as Tim
 Farrah Cave as Michelle
 Lainey Shaw as Paula
 Izzy Neish as Abi
 Becky Lindsay as Jill

Plot 
In Newcastle in 1988, Jean is a PE teacher at a secondary school. On her way to work, she hears a news broadcast about the proposed Section 28 legislation, but switches it off. At school, she is reserved and closeted, and lies to her coworkers to avoid socialising with them after work. She regularly visits a gay bar with her friends and girlfriend Viv.

While Viv is at Jean's flat, Jean tries to watch Blind Date, while Viv refuses, declaring it to be anti-gay propaganda. Jean's sister arrives unannounced and asks her to look after her son, Sam. Jean hides Viv's presence from her sister and downplays their relationship to Sam, which angers Viv.

A new student, Lois, arrives at school. Later, Jean and Lois recognise each other in the gay bar, but do not exchange words or acknowledge the meeting later. Lois gains a sudden interest in netball and joins Jean's netball team, where she clashes with another student, Siobhan. Lois also spends more time at the bar, and befriends Jean's friendship group. Jean confronts her and tells her to stay away, warning her that she could lose her job at the school if she is outed. Viv sees Jean and Lois exiting the toilets, and leaves in anger, firstly believing that Jean is cheating on her. Jean confesses to Viv about how she knows Lois, and Viv responds by telling Jean that she is setting a poor example for her students.

Jean visits her sister for Sunday lunch, where she sees a photograph of her from her wedding day. She asks her sister to take the photograph down, and her sister reveals that she knows that Jean is a lesbian.

Jean's boss Paula finds a copy of a lesbian magazine on Jean's desk, left there by somebody else, and Jean assumes that Lois is responsible. Siobhan provokes Lois after a game of netball, and the two students fight. After Jean breaks the fight up, Siobhan kisses Lois in the shower, which Jean sees, but Siobhan claims that Lois assaulted her. Despite knowing this to be a lie, Jean goes along with it, and Lois is suspended.

Jean tries to apologise to Viv, but Viv says they cannot get back together. She also tries to make amends to Lois, but she is uninterested in talking to Jean. At a children's birthday party, Jean comes out to her brother-in-law and a friend, before bursting out in laughter as she leaves.

She convinces Lois to come with her to a house party, where Jean's friends share in the "bog fund", a co-operative fund for lesbians in the city. A friend of Jean's tells Lois that the lesbians with "real jobs" like Jean contribute to the fund. Later that night, Viv and Jean talk in friendly terms, but don't reconcile.

The next day, Jean arrives at school with a smile on her face.

Release
Blue Jean premiered on 3 September 2022 in the Venice Days section of the 79th edition of the Venice Film Festival, winning the People's Choice Award. It was nominated for the BAFTA Film Award for Outstanding Debut by a British Writer, Director or Producer and won four British Independent Film Awards.  It was released in cinemas in the United Kingdom on 10 February 2023 by Altitude Films.

Critical reception
The film received positive reviews from film critics. Review aggregator Rotten Tomatoes reports that 94% of 35 critics have given the film a positive review, with an average rating of 8 out of 10. The website's critical consensus reads, "Bridging times past with issues that are still current, Blue Jean resonates intellectually and emotionally thanks to thoughtful direction and authentic performances". Metacritic gives the film a weighted average rating of 91 out of 100, based on 5 reviews, indicating "universal acclaim".

References

External links

 

2022 drama films
British drama films
2022 directorial debut films
British LGBT-related films
2022 LGBT-related films
Films about educators